Bizarre, an American rapper and member of D12, has released three studio albums and one extended play.

Studio albums

Extended plays

Mixtapes

Singles

Guest appearances

References

Hip hop discographies
Discographies of American artists